CST7 can refer to:
 Saint-Lambert-de-Lauzon Aerodrome
 CST7 (gene)